Francesco Cavrioli (circa 1600-1670) was an Italian sculptor, active in Venice in a Baroque style.

Biography
Born in Serravalle  in the mainland of what is known Vittorio Veneto, we know little about his initial training. By 1632, he had sculpted four angels for the main altar of the Church of Santi Giovanni e Paolo in Venice. He then collaborated on work for Longhena. He completed statues of St Paul and a crucifix for the altar of Alessandro Vittoria for the same church. In 637, for the Basilica di Santa Maria della Salute he completed two sybyls for the entrance portal. He sculpted the statue (1644) depicting Venice for the stairs of the Convent at San Giorgio Maggiore. He completed some statues along with Clemente Molli for the main altar of the basilica of San Pietro di Castello. He sculpted the Risen Christ for the church of the Tolentini. He also completed two allegorical statues depicting Prudence and Magnaminity  (1663) for the typanum of the Monument to Gerolamo Cavazza designed in 1657 by Giuseppe Sardi

Note

Bibliography 
La scultura veneta del Seicento e del Settecento, Camillo Semenzato: 1966, Alfieri editor, Venice.
La scultura veneta del Seicento e del Settecento: nuovi studi, curated by Giuseppe Pavanello, editor: Istituto veneto di scienze, lettere ed arti, Venice 2002.

Sculptors from Venice
1600 births
1670 deaths
Republic of Venice sculptors
17th-century Italian sculptors
Italian male sculptors